Emlyn the Gremlyn was a CBBC puppet-presenter for the live ("Continuity") links on Children's BBC. Created/owned by BBC Worldwide, built by Darryl Worbey Studios and puppeteered by Tim Jones and Grant Mason, Emlyn the Gremlyn assisted the human presenters between shows to promote the channel's programming and provide an interactive element through competitions and various sends.

Puppets